Hotel Danville, also known as the Municipal Building and City Market, is a historic hotel building located at Danville, Virginia. The main section was built in 1927–1928, and consists of a ten-story, brick main section with two smaller axes to form a "V"-shape.  The building is in the Neo-Adamesque style.  The building once included the Capitol Theater, and incorporated a three-story rectangular hipped roof wing, or annex, that was the former Municipal Building and City Market complex.  The building provides senior housing, known as Danville House.

It was listed on the National Register of Historic Places in 1984.  It is located in the Downtown Danville Historic District.

References

Hotel buildings on the National Register of Historic Places in Virginia
Colonial Revival architecture in Virginia
Hotel buildings completed in 1928
Buildings and structures in Danville, Virginia
National Register of Historic Places in Danville, Virginia
Individually listed contributing properties to historic districts on the National Register in Virginia
1928 establishments in Virginia